Carl Johan Schlyter (29 January 1795 – 29 December 1888) was a Swedish jurist and law publisher. He is known for publishing scholarly editions of the medieval Swedish laws in 13 volumes, a process which took over 50 years.

Biography

Background and education 
Schlyter was born in Karlskrona, Blekinge, Sweden. Schlyter belonged to an originally Northern German family that immigrated to Denmark, while Scania belonged to this kingdom. His father was Admiralty Chamberlain and later General War Commissary Carl Johan Schlyter and his mother was Lovisa Maria Hjelm. He received a private education and after graduating in 1807, Schlyter continued his studies at Lund University under the supervision of his brother-in-law, adjunct (later bishop) . His instructors there included Carl Adolph Agardh in algebra and Esaias Tegnér in Swedish. He took the preliminary examination in 1811, the examination for the court clerkship in 1812 and the chancellery examination in 1813.

In 1814, he received his magister degree in Rostock, Germany, and in 1816 he was appointed by Professor (and mentor)  as docent in criminal law at Lund University.

He was a notary and honorary member of Blekingska student nation at Lund University.

Career 
In order to pursue a career in the civil service, Schlyter moved to Stockholm the same year, where he served in the Chancellor of Justice's Office and the Svea Court of Appeal from 1820 to 1822. In 1822 a new field opened up for him, when, with the encouragement of Johan Gabriel Richert, he was awarded the Royal Majesty's commission to publish Sweden's old laws together with Collin. In conjunction with this assignment, Schlyter applied for and was granted an unpaid professorship at Lund University in 1822, a position he held until 1835. He and Collin published the first volume, Vestgötalagen, in 1827, complete with a stemma of the manuscripts – potentially the first stemma.

In 1835, when he received the title of professor, he was appointed to a new professorship in law history in Uppsala, but by 1838 he had moved back to Lund, where he was appointed to the professorship in general legal experience. He was rector of Lund University in 1839–1840, succeeding Johan Henrik Thomander. In 1840 he exchanged his professorship position for the professorship of general legal history, which he held until 23 November 1852. From this time until 1876, when he was dismissed, he enjoyed a permanent leave of absence for the publication of the ancient provincial laws. Schlyter continued the work alone after Collin's death (1833), successfully completing it in 1877. Regarding the project, he is said to have stated, "it would be better to delay this for another 50 years than for such an important work to fall into unskilled hands".

Its main task was to draft new civil and criminal legislation, which he approached from a conservative perspective. He remained on the committee until 1848.

Awards 
Schlyter, who was awarded a jubilee doctor in philosophy (1865) and law (1870, both in Lund), also earned membership in the Royal Swedish Academy of Letters, History and Antiquities (1837), the Royal Swedish Academy of Sciences (1856) and several other learned societies, among other scientific honors. In 1838 the Swedish Academy awarded him the Royal Prize "for merits in literature and language" and in 1860 unanimously called him to membership, a call which Schlyter did not accept, mainly because he, at the age of 66, considered that he needed all his remaining time and energy for the completion, if possible, of the great work of law. In 1864 he was awarded the Letterstedt Award for Excellent Work by the Academy of Sciences.

From 1869 Schlyter was also a member of the Royal Swedish Academy of Music, in recognition of his outstanding talent as a pianist.

When the Swedish Academy celebrated its centenary in 1886, it awarded Schlyter one of two major gold medals minted for the occasion (the other went to Zachris Topelius).

Religion 
Schlyter was deeply religious. His family's religious background includes , a prominent Reformation priest during the 1500s. Along with Holmbergson, he belonged to influential provost Henric Schartau's circles. He published Schartau's theological writings and sermons after Schartau's death as well as translating the works of theologian Heinrich Wilhelm Rinck. Schlyter also wrote on religious topics: he wrote and published  ('On the Bible Commission's Revised Translation of the New Testament') in 1878 and a children's catechism in 1880. Schlyter made a religious dedication in the final volume of his legal work, stating, "If the question has to be raised whether somebody should be honored for this work, the honor belongs to Him, Him alone, who is mighty in the weak and who has given courage and force to its realization".

Family 
Schlyter married Carolina Christina Liljeschöld in Uppsala in 1835. Veterinarian Hjalmar Kinberg was his nephew, and his grandson, Karl Schlyter (son of Gustaf Ragnar), was a lawyer and minister of justice.

Death 
Schlyter died in Lund in 1888. He is buried in the monastery cemetery in Lund.

Memorials and legacy 
In 1889, the Swedish Academy struck a memorial medal and, at its annual celebration on 20 December the same year, held a memorial service for him. The Academy of Sciences followed suit in both respects on 31 March 1894.

Works 

  (1816)
  (1819)
 
 Appendices to Johan Christofer Lindblad's thesis  (1832)
  (1835)
 
 
 
 
 Several academic programs as well as minor papers in, among others, .
 Published almost all of the works left by provost Henric Schartau.

Awards 

 1838 – Royal Prize
 1873 – Commander Grand Cross, Order of the Polar Star

References

Notes

Sources

External links 

1795 births
1888 deaths
19th-century jurists
Commanders Grand Cross of the Order of the Polar Star
Members of the Royal Swedish Academy of Music
Members of the Royal Swedish Academy of Letters, History and Antiquities
Members of the Royal Swedish Academy of Sciences
Rectors of Lund University
People from Karlskrona
Legal history of Sweden